Hopea enicosanthoides is a tree in the family Dipterocarpaceae, native to Borneo. The specific epithet enicosanthoides refers to the leaves' resemblance to those of the genus Enicosanthum (now Monoon).

Description
It has thin, low buttresses and stilt roots. The bark is smooth.

Distribution and habitat
Hopea enicosanthoides is endemic to Borneo, where it is confined to Sarawak.

Conservation
Hopea enicosanthoides has been assessed as endangered on the IUCN Red List. It is threatened by land conversion for palm oil plantations, logging and urban development. The species does not occur in protected areas.

References

enicosanthoides
Endemic flora of Borneo
Flora of Sarawak
Plants described in 1967